The Connecticut State Troubadour is an honorary position, established in 1991 by the Connecticut General Assembly.  The State Troubadour functions as an ambassador of music and song and promotes cultural literacy among Connecticut citizens.  It began as an annual position, in 1999 was changed to a two-year appointment, and in 2018 was changed to a three-year appointment;  it carries a $5,000 total stipend. The responsibilities of the position include performing at least three events at the request of the Connecticut Commission on Culture & Tourism, promoting the state in song, and serving on panels to select future state troubadours.

Post holders
Tom Callinan - 1991-1992
Sandy and Caroline Paton - 1993
Phil Rosenthal - 1994
Bill Pere - 1995
Mike Kachuba - 1996
Sally Rogers (singer) - 1997
Jeff and Synia McQuillan - 1998
Hugh Blumenfeld - 1999-2000
Kevin Briody - 2001-2002
Dennis Waring - 2003-2004
Thomasina Levy - 2005-2006
Pierce Campbell - 2007-2008
Lara Herscovitch - 2009-2010
Chuck Costa - 2011-2012
Kristen Graves - 2013-2015 
Kate Callahan - 2016-2018 
Nekita Waller - 2018-2021 
Kala Farnham - 2022-2025

References 

Troubador